The Maggie Dixon Division I Rookie Coach of the Year Award is an award given annually since 2007 to the head coach in women's college basketball in the NCAA Division I competition who achieves great success in their first year as a Division I head coach. Given by the Women's Basketball Coaches Association (WBCA), the award is named for former women's head coach Maggie Dixon, who coached at Army for the 2005–06 season before suddenly dying due to valve complications from an enlarged heart. Dixon had been named head coach just 11 days before the start of the season but led the Black Knights to a 20–11 record and won the Patriot League tournament championship. It was Army's first basketball team, men or women, to play in the NCAA Tournament. Although Army would lose in the first round to Tennessee, Dixon was named the Patriot League Coach of the Year and received much praise from the college basketball community for her coaching job in just her first season. On April 6, 2006, Dixon died at the age of 28 to what her brother Jamie Dixon, then head men's basketball coach at Pittsburgh, described as an "arrhythmic episode to her heart."

Winners

Winners by school

Gallery

References

External links
Maggie Dixon Award webpage. Women's Basketball Coaches Association (WBCA) official website

Awards established in 2007
College basketball trophies and awards in the United States